The Littlewood Treaty Document, also known as the Littlewood Document, is claimed to be the final English draft of Te Tiriti o Waitangi that was then translated into the Māori language and signed on dogskin parchment at Waitangi on 6 February 1840. The document was rediscovered in 1989.

Its date of 4 February 1840 and that it is written in the handwriting of James Busby, the British Resident in 1840, would appear to support this claim.
James Busby helped draft the Treaty of Waitangi with Lieutenant Governor William Hobson, lending credibility to the claim of it being the final English version approved by Hobson before being translated into Māori.

References

Treaty of Waitangi